GrantMe is a Canadian online education consulting platform founded by Madison Guy in 2017 with its headquarters in Vancouver, Canada. GrantMe is aimed at helping students get into universities and secure funding to support their post-secondary education goals.

History 
In 2012, Madison Guy graduated from Brookswood Secondary and attended the University of British Columbia on a soccer scholarship. In 2015, Guy led the UBC Thunderbirds to win the U Sports women's soccer championship which resulted in winning a scholarship that would secure her tuition at Sauder School of Business. But she looked into scholarships to cover her expenses such as housing, books and food, and eventually, she earned $50,000 in scholarships for her last three years of university.

Following her graduation in 2017, Guy founded GrantMe to help students win student bursaries and scholarships. Within a few months of its inception, GrantMe secured $121,800 in scholarships for students and increased to over $3 million by 2020, and $5 million by January 2021 and provided for 2,700 students. For establishing GrantMe, Guy was awarded the 30 Under 30 Award by British Columbia's regional business magazine, BCBusiness in 2020, and was named a Forbes 30 Under 30 top young entrepreneurs of 2021.

References

External links 
 Official website

Education in Canada
Education companies of Canada
Companies based in Vancouver
Online companies of Canada
2018 establishments in Canada